Manchester Apartments is a historic apartment building in Indianapolis, Indiana. It was built in 1929, and is a three-story, Tudor Revival style brick building.  It measures 40 feet wide and 210 feet long and features a gable front pavilion with stucco and decorative half-timbering. The building was remodeled in 1971. It is next to the Sheffield Inn.

It was listed on the National Register of Historic Places in 1998.

References

External links

Apartment buildings in Indiana
Residential buildings on the National Register of Historic Places in Indiana
Residential buildings completed in 1929
Tudor Revival architecture in Indiana
Residential buildings in Indianapolis
National Register of Historic Places in Indianapolis
1929 establishments in Indiana